Hipólito Anacarsis Lanús (November 14, 1820 in Concepción del Uruguay, Entre Ríos – October 14, 1888) was an Argentine entrepreneur of French and Greek and Basque origin.

Biography
He played a role during the years of the secessionist State of Buenos Aires movement. He was also Deputy Head of Police in the city of Buenos Aires.

Later, during the War of Triple Alliance, he became one of the richest men in his country as a purveyor to the Triple Alliance armies, and also during the Conquest of the Desert.

Bibliography 
 Cutolo, Vicente, Nuevo diccionario biográfico argentino, 7 volúmenes, Ed. Elche, Bs. As., 1968–1985.
 León Pomer, La guerra del Paraguay, Ed. Leviatán, Bs. As., 2008. 
 López Mato, Omar, 1874: Historia de la revolución olvidada, Ed. Olmo, s/f.

References 

1820 births
1888 deaths
People from Entre Ríos Province
People from Buenos Aires
Argentine people of French descent
Argentine people of Greek descent
Argentine businesspeople
Lanús
People of the Paraguayan War
Burials at La Recoleta Cemetery